Kolkuh (also Romanized as Kolkūh) is a village in Tulem Rural District, Tulem District, Sowme'eh Sara County, Gilan Province, Iran. At the 2006 census, its population was 118, in 33 families.

References 

Populated places in Sowme'eh Sara County